Josef Lauff (16 November 1855 - 1933) was a German poet and dramatist.

He was born at Cologne, the son of a jurist. He was educated at Münster in Westphalia, and entering the army served as a lieutenant of artillery at Thorn and subsequently at Cologne, where he attained the rank of captain in 1890. In 1898 he was summoned by the German emperor, William II, to Wiesbaden, being at the same time promoted to major's rank, in order that he might devote his great dramatic talents to the royal theatre.

His literary career began with the epic poems Jan van Calker, ein Malerlied vom Niederrhein (1887, 3rd ed., 1892) and Der Helfensteiner, ein Sang aus dem Bauernkriege (3rd ed., 1896). These were followed by Die Overstolzin (5th ed., 1900), Herodias (2nd ed., 1898) and Die Geißlerin (4th ed., 1902). He also wrote the novels Die Hexe (6th ed., 1900), Regina coeli (a story of the fall of the Dutch Republic) (7th ed., 1904), Die Hauptmannsfrau (8th ed., 1903) and Marie Verwahnen (1903).

But he is best known as a dramatist. Beginning with the tragedy Inez de Castro (1894), he proceeded to dramatize the great monarchs of his country, and, in a Hohenzollern tetralogy, issued Der Burggraf (1897, 6th ed. 1900) and Der Eisenzahn (1900), to be followed by Der grosse Kurfurst (The Great Elector) and Friedrich der Große (Frederick the Great).

See A. Schroeter, Josef Lauff, Em litterarisches Zeitbild (1899), and B. Sturm, Josef Lauff (1903).

References

1855 births
1933 deaths
German poets
People from the Rhine Province
Writers from Cologne
German male poets
German male dramatists and playwrights
19th-century German dramatists and playwrights
19th-century German male writers
19th-century German writers
20th-century German dramatists and playwrights